MakoLab is an international IT company with its headquarters in Łódź, Poland, specialised in business web software. Since 2007 MakoLab is listed on the Warsaw Stock Exchange. For some R&D projects Makolab works in collaboration with John Paul II University (KUL) in Lublin. The company has offices in Poland, Paris, London, Munich and Tampa (Florida).

Makolab has also been an contributor to the development of the web-based ontological dictionary Schema.org, focusing more specifically on automotive and financial ontologies  and the EDM Council

References

External links 
 General Automotive Ontology Website
 Financial Industry Business Ontology Community
 Makolab on the Warsaw Stock Exchange
 MakoLab Delivery Center at KUL
 Makolab Warsaw Stock Exchange Profile
 Member Profile on the EDM Council

Companies based in Łódź
Companies listed on the Warsaw Stock Exchange